Touahria is a town and commune in Mostaganem Province, Algeria. It is located in Mesra District. According to the 1998 census it has a population of 6,674.

References

Communes of Mostaganem Province